Detroit Rock City is a 1999 American teen comedy film directed by Adam Rifkin and written by Carl V. Dupré. It tells of four teenage boys in a Kiss tribute band who try to see their idols in a concert in Detroit in 1978. Comparable with other rock films such as Rock 'n' Roll High School, Dazed and Confused, and I Wanna Hold Your Hand, it tells a coming-of-age story through a filter of 1970s music and culture in the United States. It took its title from the Kiss song of the same name.

The film was shot at Cedarbrae Collegiate Institute in Scarborough, Toronto and other Ontario locations including Copps Coliseum in Hamilton. The film received mixed reviews from critics and grossed approximately $6 million against a $17 million budget.

Plot
In 1978 Cleveland, Ohio, four rebellious teenage boys – Hawk, Lex, Trip Verudie, and Jeremiah "Jam" Bruce – play in a Kiss cover band called "Mystery" and prepare to see their idols in concert in Detroit, Michigan the following night. Their hopes are dashed when Jam's religiously conservative mother finds their tickets and burns them before having Jam transferred to a Catholic boarding school.

After Trip manages to win tickets and backstage passes from a radio contest in Detroit, the boys, disguised as pizza deliverymen, rescue Jam from the boarding school by drugging Father Phillip McNulty using a pizza topped with hallucinogen mushrooms before setting off for Detroit in Lex's mother's Volvo to collect the tickets. En route, they get into a road rage incident with disco fanatics Kenny and Bobby after Trip throws a slice of pizza on their windshield. They beat up the disco duo and continue their journey before picking up Kenny's girlfriend Christine, who dumped Kenny due to his behavior.

Upon arriving in Detroit, the boys discover that Trip did not stay on the phone long enough to give the radio station his information, resulting in the tickets being given to the next caller. When they exit the building they find the Volvo missing, which they deduce Christine stole. After briefly arguing amongst themselves, the four split up to find Kiss tickets and the Volvo, planning to regroup in 105 minutes. Hawk finds a scalper who suggests he enter a male stripping contest to raise money for tickets. He gets drunk and loses the contest after vomiting, but is offered payment for the company and has sex with an older woman named Amanda Finch. After being paid, he locates the scalper, only to discover that his tickets are sold out. Trip goes to a local convenience store, hoping to mug a younger child for his ticket but the boy's older brother, Chongo, and his friends, confront and threaten him for $200. He then plans to rob the store with a Stretch Armstrong doll disguised as a gun, but ends up receiving $150 after thwarting a genuine robbery attempt. Trip gives the money to Chongo's gang, but they assault him regardless and consequently steal his wallet.

Lex sneaks backstage with the concert loading crew but is caught and tossed over a fence where he tames a group of vicious dogs with a Frisbee, then saves Christine and the Volvo from two car thieves (who are responsible for stealing the car) at a nearby chop shop. Jam encounters his mother at an anti-Kiss rally, who forcibly takes his drumsticks before dragging him to a nearby church for confessional with a perverted priest who is more interested in salacious conversation, rather than an actual confession. He is then greeted by Beth Bumstein, a classmate who is moving to Ann Arbor. After admitting their feelings for each other, they have sex before parting ways, agreeing to maintain contact with each other. Jam, imbued with new confidence, returns to the rally and criticizes his mother's domineering ways and hypocrisy, telling her that her extreme religious views and controlling attitude have only caused him to despise religion and rebel. He ultimately breaks her spirit by labelling her as a lousy mother and proclaiming to her and the rally attendees that he lost his virginity in a confessional booth. He then demands his drumsticks back, one of which she broke in half. She does so and apologizes to him, remarking to the crowd, "They grow up fast, don't they?".

When the boys meet up empty-handed, Jam suggests beating each other up to imply having been mugged for their tickets. Upon their arrival at Cobo Hall, the guards initially doubt the boys' claims, until Trip points out Chongo's gang, who are just entering, as their assailants. When the guards search them, they find Trip's wallet with his  Kiss Army picture ID and money, then confiscate Chongo's tickets and give them to the boys before escorting him, his little brother, and his friends out of the concert. Shocked and delighted, the quartet enter the concert hall as Kiss plays the film's title song. As it ends, Peter Criss throws a drumstick, which Jam joyfully and excitedly catches.

Cast
Members of KIϟϟ
 Paul Stanley as The Starchild
 Gene Simmons as The Demon
 Peter Criss as The Cat
 Ace Frehley as The Spaceman

Other

Release

Box office
Detroit Rock City opened in 1,802 theaters on August 13, 1999, and earned $2,005,512 in its opening weekend, ranking number 13 in the domestic box office. By the end of its run, it had grossed only $4,217,115 with an additional $1,608,199 from international sales, bringing its worldwide total gross to $5,825,314. Against an estimated $17 million budget, it was a box office bomb. To KISS and rock fans, the film is considered a cult classic.

Critical reception
Detroit Rock City received mixed reviews from critics. Review aggregator website Rotten Tomatoes shows that out of 41 reviews, it has a 49% rating. The website's critics consensus reads, "Silly plot, over-the-top directing style." On Metacritic, it has a 33/100 rating based on 18 critics, indicating "generally unfavorable reviews".

Home media
Detroit Rock City was released via VHS and DVD on December 21, 1999. DVD special features include four audio commentaries (director Rifkin, selected cast and crew members, and all four original Kiss members), deleted scenes, multi-angle views of the Kiss concert, an instructional segment featuring a step-by-step guitar lesson for "Rock and Roll All Nite", original screen test footage, and DVD-ROM features.

In December 2007, the film was re-released on DVD as an exclusive bonus fifth disc contained within Kissology Volume Three: 1992–2000. It was only available with initial pre-orders sold during VH1 Classic's 24 Hours of Kissmas weekend marathon.

The film was released on Blu-ray in April 2015, containing additional special features, not in the original DVD release.

Soundtrack

The soundtrack was released on August 3, 1999, by Mercury Records. The album features a mix of classic rock songs and covers of classic rock songs by contemporary artists. It also features a new song by KISS titled "Nothing Can Keep Me From You".

Track listing

See also
 List of American films of 1999
 Kiss

References

External links

 
 
 
 

1999 films
1990s teen comedy films
1990s buddy comedy films
1990s comedy road movies
American buddy comedy films
American coming-of-age comedy films
American comedy road movies
American rock music films
American teen comedy films
Cultural depictions of Kiss (band)
Films about musical groups
Films based on songs
Films directed by Adam Rifkin
Films scored by J. Peter Robinson
Films set in 1978
Films set in Cleveland
Films set in Detroit
Films shot in Hamilton, Ontario
Films shot in Toronto
1999 comedy films
Films set in the 1970s
New Line Cinema films
Films about fandom
1990s English-language films
1990s American films